Tatiana of Russia may refer to:

 Tatyana Mikhailovna of Russia (1636–1706), daughter of Michael of Russia
 Princess Tatiana Constantinovna of Russia (1890–1979), daughter of Grand Duke Constantine Constantinovich 
 Grand Duchess Tatiana Nikolaevna of Russia (1897–1918), daughter of Nicholas II